The 1990–91 Algerian Championnat National was the 29th season of the Algerian Championnat National since its establishment in 1962. A total of 16 teams contested the league, with JS Kabylie as the defending champions, The Championnat started on August 30, 1990. and ended on october 1, 1991.

Team summaries

Promotion and relegation 
Teams promoted from Algerian Division 2 1990-1991 
 NA Hussein Dey
 ES Guelma

Teams relegated to Algerian Division 2 1991-1992
 CS Constantine
 RC Kouba

League table

References

External links
1990–91 Algerian Championnat National

Algerian Championnat National
Championnat National
Algerian Ligue Professionnelle 1 seasons